Ford Freestyle may refer to:
 Ford Taurus X, mid-size crossover SUV produced as the Ford Freestyle from 2005 to 2007
 A CUV variant of the Ford Figo, produced since 2018 for India